Puthuppally Raghavan (1910–2000) was an Indian freedom fighter, writer and communist activist from the state of Kerala, India.

Political life
Raghavan was an active participant in the Indian freedom struggle. He was a member of travancore state congress and the youth league. Later he was attracted to communist ideologies and played a key role in organising the Communist party of India in the Principality of Travancore. He was jailed many times for his activities.

His autobiography is titled Viplava Smaranakal.

Works
Kerala pathrapravarthana charithram 
Kaneerinteyum chorayudeyum Kathakal
Indian viplavathinte ithihaasam

References 

Indian independence activists from Kerala